The Eurovision Song Contest 1983 was the 28th edition of the annual Eurovision Song Contest. Organised by the European Broadcasting Union (EBU) and host broadcasters Arbeitsgemeinschaft der öffentlich-rechtlichen Rundfunkanstalten der Bundesrepublik Deutschland (ARD) and Bayerischer Rundfunk (BR), the contest was held at the Rudi-Sedlmayer-Halle on 23 April 1983 and was hosted by German dancer Marlene Charell.

It was also the second year in a row where the winning entry was performed last on the night and the second year in a row in which  won 2nd place.

The 1983 contest was the first to be televised in Australia, via Channel 0/28 (now SBS Television) in Sydney and Melbourne.

Location

Munich is a German city and capital of the Bavarian state. As the capital, Munich houses the parliament and state government. Rudi-Sedlmayer-Halle was chosen to host the contest. It was initially named after the president of the Bavarian State Sport Association. The 6,700-seat hall opened in 1972 to host basketball events for the 1972 Summer Olympics.

Format

Stage design
The set that year was a quite small, arc-shaped stage surrounding the orchestra section, and a large background resembling giant electric heaters, which lit up in different sequences and combinations depending on the nature and rhythm of the songs.

Presentation format
Hostess Marlene Charell made all of her announcements in German before translating a repetition in both French and English. After presenting all of the 20 participating acts at the start of the show and then making a formal welcome, Charell also introduced each song individually, standing in front of elaborate floral arrangements, all of which she had designed herself, in place of a pre-filmed 'postcard'. In all three languages, Charel named the country, song title, performing artist, author, composer and conductor. Together with an on screen title card naming the upcoming country prior to her verbal introductions, this extended the break in between each song to three minutes minimally.

Due to host Marlene Charell's choice to announce points in three languages instead of two, the voting went on for nearly an hour, stretching the Eurovision contest past three hours for the second time ever, after 1979. In addition, Charell made 13 language mistakes throughout the voting, some as innocuous as mixing up the words for "points" between the three languages, some as major as nearly awarding points to "Schweden" (Sweden) that were meant for "Schweiz" (Switzerland).

The language problems also occurred during the contest introductions, as Charell introduced the Finnish singer Ami Aspelund as "Ami Aspesund", furthermore she introduced the Norwegian conductor Sigurd Jansen as "...Johannes...Skorgan...", having been forced to make up a name on the spot after forgetting the conductor's name.

Interval act
The interval show was a dance number set to a medley of German songs which had become internationally famous, including "Strangers in the Night". The host, Marlene Charell, was the lead dancer.

Song success
Ofra Haza from Israel, who took the second place, had an enduring success with her song "Hi" (חי) which became a hit in Europe, launching her career. Her song, "Främling", became very popular in Sweden and in various other European countries. In the Netherlands, the song reached the top five, coupled with a Dutch-language version ("Je ogen hebben geen geheimen") which was performed by Carola herself. The 4th placed "Džuli", also became a hit in Europe. Singer Daniel released an English-language version as "Julie".

Nul points
This year's nul points were shared by Spain and Turkey. Spain's Remedios Amaya presented a song which was a stark departure from pop tastes and conventional perception of melody and harmony as it was a flamenco one, a style traditionally tied with the international image of Spain. Additionally, she sang her song barefoot. Some olés were heard from the present audience when she ended her performance. Turkey's entry, Opera, performed by Çetin Alp & the Short Waves, could on the other hand be said to fit in well with the spirit of Eurovision of that time. Nevertheless, the overinterpretation of the theme of the song, as well as the fact that the lyrics of the song consisted for the most part of the often-repeated word "opera" and names of well-known operas and composers, and Çetin's breaking into operatic "lay lay la", prompted extensive derision of the song, including the usual sardonic words from BBC commentator Terry Wogan ("a nicely understated performance there").

Participating countries 
On the other hand,  was absent this year for the first time because RTÉ workers were in strike action at the time.

Conductors 
Each performance had a conductor who directed the orchestra.

 François Rauber
 Sigurd Jansen
 John Coleman
 Anders Ekdahl
 Maurizio Fabrizio
 
 José Miguel Evoras
 Robert Weber
 Ossi Runne
 Mimis Plessas
 Piet Souer
 Radovan Papović
 
 Dieter Reith
 Allan Botschinsky
 
 Mike Sergeant
 Richard Oesterreicher
 
 Michel Bernholc

Returning artists

Participants and results

Detailed voting results 

Each country had a jury who awarded 12, 10, 8, 7, 6, 5, 4, 3, 2, 1 point(s) to their top ten songs.

12 points 
Below is a summary of all 12 points in the final:

Spokespersons 

Each country announced their votes in the order of performance. The following is a list of spokespersons who announced the votes for their respective country.

 Nicole André
 Erik Diesen
 Colin Berry
 Agneta Bolme Börjefors
 Paola Perissi
 Fatih Orbay
 Rosa Campano
 Michel Stocker
 Solveig Herlin
 Irini Gavala
 Flip van der Schalie
 TBD
 Anna Partelidou
 Carolin Reiber
 Bent Evold
 Yitzhak Shim'oni
 João Abel Fonseca
 Tilia Herold
 An Ploegaerts
 Jacques Harvey

Broadcasts 

Each participating broadcaster was required to relay the contest via its networks. Non-participating EBU member broadcasters were also able to relay the contest as "passive participants". Broadcasters were able to send commentators to provide coverage of the contest in their own native language and to relay information about the artists and songs to their television viewers. Known details on the broadcasts in each country, including the specific broadcasting stations and commentators are shown in the tables below.

Notes

References

External links

 

 
1983
Music festivals in Germany
1983 in music
1983 in West Germany
1980s in Munich
April 1983 events in Europe
Events in Munich